Dimitrios Charitopoulos (alternate spellings: Dimitris, Haritopoulos) (Greek: Δημήτρης Χαριτόπουλος; born November 14, 1983) is a Greek professional basketball player and the team captain for Iraklis of the Greek A2 Basket League. He is 2.07 m (6 ft 9  in) tall, and he weighs 113 kg (250 lbs). He is a power forward-center.

Professional career
After playing in the Greek minors with G.S. Siatistas, Charitopoulos began his professional career with Aris during the 2002–03 season. He moved to PAOK in 2006. In February 2012, he joined ASVEL. In September 2013, he signed with Spanish club CB Valladolid.

For the 2014–15 season, he signed with La Bruixa d'Or Manresa of Spain's Liga ACB, where he averaged 4.2 points in 17 games. On January 30, 2015, he left the Spanish club. Three days later, he signed with his former team, PAOK.

On August 31, 2016, Charitopoulos signed a one-year contract with AEK Athens of the Greek Basket League.

National team career
Charitopoulos was a member of the junior national teams of Greece. With Greece's junior national team, he won the gold medal at the 2002 FIBA Europe Under-20 Championship. Charitopoulos also won the silver medal at the 2005 Mediterranean Games, while playing with Greece's under-26 national selection.

Career statistics

FIBA Champions League

|-
| style="text-align:left;" | 2016–17
| style="text-align:left;" | AEK
| 7 || 7.3 || .692 || .500 || .800 || 1.1 || .6 || .4 || 0 || 3.3
|}

Domestic Leagues

Regular season

|-
| 2015–16
| style="text-align:left;"| Koroivos
| align=center | GBL
| 23 || 23.0 || .512 || .350 || .743 || 3.2 || .8 || .4 || .1 || 8.4
|-
| 2016–17
| style="text-align:left;"| A.E.K.
| align=center | GBL
| 18 || 6.3 || .308 || .250 || .600 || 1.1 || .3 || .1 || 0 || .8
|-
| 2018–19
| style="text-align:left;"| Ifaistos
| align=center | GBL
| 23 || 10.4 || .493 || .370 || .690 || 2.3 || .6 || .3 || 0 || 4.2
|}

Awards and accomplishments
2002 FIBA Europe Under-20 Championship: 
FIBA Europe Champions Cup Champion: (2003)
Greek Cup Winner: (2004)
Greek Youth All-Star Game MVP: (2005)
2005 Mediterranean Games: 
Bulgarian League Champion: (2013)

References

External links
EuroCup Profile
FIBA Profile
FIBA Europe Profile
Eurobasket.com Profile
Greek Basket League Profile 
Spanish League Profile 
French League Profile 
Draftexpress.com Profile
Hellenic Federation Profile 

1983 births
Living people
AEK B.C. players
Aris B.C. players
ASVEL Basket players
Bàsquet Manresa players
CB Valladolid players
Centers (basketball)
Competitors at the 2005 Mediterranean Games
Greek men's basketball players
Greek Basket League players
Ifaistos Limnou B.C. players
Iraklis Thessaloniki B.C. players
Koroivos B.C. players
Liga ACB players
Maroussi B.C. players
Mediterranean Games medalists in basketball
Mediterranean Games silver medalists for Greece
Panionios B.C. players
P.A.O.K. BC players
PBC Academic players
Power forwards (basketball)
Trikala B.C. players
Sportspeople from Alexandreia, Greece